Binford is a surname. Notable people with the surname include:

 Greta Binford, arachnologist
 Julien Binford (1908–1997), painter and professor of painting
 Lewis Binford (1931–2011), archaeologist
 Lloyd Binford (1869–1956), insurance executive 
 Melvin J. Binford (1903–1984), football and basketball coach 
 Sally Binford (1924–1994), anthropologist and archaeologist
 Thomas Binford, computer scientist at Stanford University
 Tom Binford (1924–1999), businessman and philanthropist

See also
 Binford (disambiguation)